Blyth Valley, formerly known as Blyth, is a constituency represented in the House of Commons of the UK Parliament since 2019 by Ian Levy, a Conservative.

Constituency profile
The constituency is in the former Northumberland Coalfield where mining and shipbuilding were once significant industries. Residents' incomes and wealth are slightly below average for the UK.

History
The constituency of Blyth was established under the Representation of the People Act 1948 for the 1950 general election. Following the reorganisation of local authorities resulting from the Local Government Act 1972, it was renamed Blyth Valley for the 1983 general election to correspond with the newly formed Borough of Blyth Valley. 

In the 2019 general election, Blyth Valley was the third seat to declare and the first Conservative victory of the election, pointing towards many similar Conservative victories in Labour's Red Wall as the night went on.

Boundaries

1950–1974 (Blyth): The Municipal Borough of Blyth, and the Urban Districts of Bedlingtonshire, and Seaton Valley.

Blyth and Bedlington were transferred from Morpeth. Seaton Valley (incorporating Cramlington, Seghill, Earsdon and Seaton Delaval) was added from the abolished constituency of Wansbeck.

1974–1983 (Blyth): The borough of Blyth, and the urban districts of Bedlingtonshire, and Seaton Valley.

The boundary with Hexham was slightly amended to take account of changes to local government boundaries.

1983–present (Blyth Valley): The Borough of Blyth Valley.

Bedlington was transferred to the re-established constituency of Wansbeck. Small area in the south (Backworth and Earsdon), which was now part of the metropolitan borough of North Tyneside in Tyne and Wear, transferred to Wallsend.

2007 boundary review 
In the fifth periodic boundary review of parliamentary representation in Northumberland, which came into effect for the 2010 general election, the Boundary Commission for England recommended that no changes be made to the Blyth Valley constituency.

In 2009, a further government reorganisation resulted in the abolition of all local government boroughs and districts in Northumberland and the establishment of the county as a unitary authority. Accordingly, although this has not affected the current constituency boundaries, the constituency now contains the Northumberland County Council wards of: Cowpen, Cramlington East, Cramlington Eastfield, Cramlington North, Cramlington South East, Cramlington Village, Cramlington West, Croft, Hartley, Holywell, Isabella, Kitty Brewster, Newsham, Plessey, Seghill with Seaton Delaval, South Blyth, and Wensleydale.

Members of Parliament

Elections

Elections in the 2010s

Elections in the 2000s

Elections in the 1990s

Elections in the 1980s

Elections in the 1970s

Elections in the 1960s

Elections in the 1950s

See also
List of parliamentary constituencies in Northumberland
History of parliamentary constituencies and boundaries in Northumberland

Notes

References

External links 
nomis Constituency Profile for Blyth Valley presenting data from the ONS annual population survey and other official statistics.

Parliamentary constituencies in Northumberland
Constituencies of the Parliament of the United Kingdom established in 1950
Blyth, Northumberland